Rudolf Deyl (6 July 1912 – 21 November 1967) was a Czechoslovak actor. His father Rudolf Deyl Sr. was also an actor.

Selected filmography

References

External links
 

1912 births
1967 deaths

Czechoslovak male actors
20th-century Czech male actors
Male actors from Prague